= National Ethics Council =

National Ethics Council (Romanian: Consiliul Național de Etică) is a Romanian consultative body working with the National Authority for Scientific Research, created in 2004 to control misconduct and plagiarism in scientific research, comprising scientists selected by the research minister of the Romanian Government.
